In February 2004, Major League Baseball announced a new drug policy which originally included random, offseason testing and 10-day suspensions for first-time offenders, 30 days for second-time offenders, 60 days for third-time offenders, and one year for fourth-time offenders, all without pay, in an effort to curtail performance-enhancing drug use (PED) in professional baseball. This policy strengthened baseball's pre-existing ban on controlled substances, including steroids, which has been in effect since 1991. The policy was to be reviewed in 2008, but under pressure from the U.S. Congress, on November 15, 2005, players and owners agreed to tougher penalties; a 50-game suspension for a first offense, a 100-game suspension for a second, and a lifetime ban for a third.

In December 2009, Sports Illustrated named baseball's steroid scandal of performance-enhancing drugs as the number one sports story of the decade of the 2000s.

The current penalties, adopted on March 28, 2014, are 80 games for a first offense, 162 games for a second offense, and a permanent suspension ("lifetime ban") for a third. Players are also ineligible from participating in the post-season the same year they receive a suspension, regardless of when their suspension is completed, unless the penalty is reduced on appeal. Players receiving a permanent suspension can apply to the Commissioner of Baseball for reinstatement after one year, which if granted can occur not sooner than two years after the suspension started.

Suspended players
Players are ordered by the announced date of their suspension, placed in the appropriate table per their MLB experience and roster status at the time they were suspended. Players who are active in professional baseball (not limited to MLB) are listed in italics; players who have retired or have been a free agent for over a year are not considered "active".

Players who were on major league rosters
Players listed in this section were active in MLB at the time of their suspension.

Players with major league experience on minor league rosters or free agents
This table lists players with prior MLB experience who, at the time of their suspension, were in Minor League Baseball or were a free agent.

Players with only minor league experience
This table lists players who, at the time of their suspension, were in Minor League Baseball with no prior MLB experience. Various of these players completed their suspensions and later played in MLB.

Players with major league experience in a non-affiliated professional league
This table lists players with prior MLB experience who, at the time of their suspension, were in a baseball league not affiliated with MLB, such as Nippon Professional Baseball in Japan or KBO League in Korea.

Footnotes

Players' responses

See also
 List of people banned from Major League Baseball
 Steroid use in American football

References

External links
38 Minor Leaguers Suspended For Steroids. April 4, 2005
Eleven Minor Leaguers Suspended For Steroids. May 12, 2005
Ex-Mets employee Kirk Radomski pleads guilty to distributing steroids and other charges. April 27, 2007
Bud Selig comments on the suspension of players found to have broken U.S. laws in regards to the steroid scandal. October 25, 2007

Performance-enhancing drugs
Players suspended for performance-enhancing drugs
 Suspended
Drugs in sport in the United States
Drug policy, suspensions